Canaan; is a city in and the capital of Karun County, Khuzestan Province, Iran. On 23 January 2013, this city was created from villages of Qaleh Chanan.

References 

Populated places in Karun County